William "Big Bill" Morganfield (born June 19, 1956) is an American blues singer and guitarist, who is the son of legendary McKinley Morganfield, also known as Muddy Waters.

Biography
Morganfield was born in Chicago, Illinois. He had little contact with his father.  Instead he was raised in Southern Florida by his grandmother, and now lives in Atlanta, Georgia.  As a child he listened to his father's records, but also to more popular fare such as The Jackson Five.  He came to music later in life, having first worked as a teacher after earning a bachelor's degree in English from Tuskegee University and another in Communications from Auburn University. He did not begin playing music seriously until after his father's death in 1983, and then spent six years studying guitar.  A well-received performance with Lonnie Mack at Atlanta's Center Stage convinced Morganfield that his career move was a good one, but dissatisfied with his craft, he returned to studying traditional blues forms and songwriting while continuing work as a teacher.

He got his first break in 1996 when he and his band ("The Stone Cold Blues Band" 1996-1998) played at the Blue Angel Cafe in Chattanooga, Tennessee. The band consisted of professional Atlanta based musicians who helped launch his career. In 1998 he then began to play the east coast that led to bigger shows like  "The Stan Rogers Folk Fest" and "Montreal Jazz fest" .

His first independent album,"Rising Son", was released in 1999 by Blind Pig Records. The album was recorded in Chicago, and featured Paul Oscher, Willie "Big Eyes" Smith, and Pinetop Perkins. In 2000, he won the W.C. Handy Award for Best New Blues Artist. The title cut was featured in the 2004 film A Love Song for Bobby Long. (In 1997 Taxium Records released a demo-intended recording of Big Bill Morganfield called "Nineteen Years Old" without the consent of Big Bill Morganfield. American laws do not apply as this recording was taken to Germany for release.)

In 1999, Morganfield appeared at the San Francisco Blues Festival.

Ramblin' Mind, Morganfield's next album, included Taj Mahal on two songs, plus his song "Strong Man Holler". Billy Branch played harmonica on the album.  In 2009, Morganfield released the album Born Lover, produced by Bob Margolin and Brian Bisesi.

During the 2000s, Morganfield headlined many festivals and performed at venues around the world. In concert, Morganfield performs his own material with an occasional number from his father's work. He also performed at a Kennedy Center Honors tribute to his father. His version of Waters' "Got My Mojo Working" has been said to be as potent as the original. Tours in Spain that band member Max Drake accompanied him on were particularly popular due to the legacy connection to Waters.

Discography
 
1997 - Nineteen Years Old
1999 - Rising Son
2001 - Ramblin' Mind
2003 - Blues in the Blood
2009 - Born Lover
2013 - Blues With a Mood
2016 - Bloodstains on the Wall

See also
List of Auburn University people
List of guitarists by genre

References

External links
Official website

1956 births
Living people
Singers from Chicago
Tuskegee University alumni
Auburn University alumni
American blues guitarists
American male guitarists
American blues singer-songwriters
Blues musicians from Illinois
Guitarists from Chicago
20th-century American guitarists
Blind Pig Records artists
African-American male singer-songwriters
African-American guitarists
20th-century African-American male singers
21st-century African-American male singers
Singer-songwriters from Illinois